Vetri Padigal is a 1991 Indian Tamil-language action thriller film directed by Manobala. The film stars Ramki and Nirosha, with Srividya, R. Sarathkumar, V. K. Ramasamy, Jai Ganesh and Vinu Chakravarthy playing supporting roles. It was released on 15 March 1991.

Plot

A robbery gang terrorized the state of Tamil Nadu. The police officer Mahesh (Ramki) is charged to dismantle the gang. Mahesh lives with his widowed  blind sister Vidya (Srividya), and his niece Anu. The reporter Vimala (Nirosha) compels Mahesh for an interview, but he refuses. She later finds herself swooning over his investigative intellect. They later fall in love with each other. Guruji (R. Sarathkumar), the local gang-buster, then becomes discomposed with Mahesh for falling in love with Vimala, his ex-fiancé.

In the past, Mahesh was a happy-go-lucky and immature youth. Furthermore, Mahesh hated the police while his brother-in-law, a police officer, was in charge to catch the robbery gang. His brother-in-law was later killed in a bomb blast, and his sister became blind. To take revenge, Mahesh became a police officer. The rest of the story is about how Mahesh catches the robbery gang and its leader Guruji.

Cast

Ramki as Mahesh
Nirosha as Vimala
R. Sarathkumar as Guruji
Srividya as Vidya
V. K. Ramasamy as Vadivelu
Jai Ganesh as Ganesh
Vinu Chakravarthy as Karuppuswamy
Janagaraj as Govind
Thyagu as Kannayiram
Kitty in a guest appearance
Disco Shanti
Idichapuli Selvaraj
Ponnambalam
Vasu
Thalapathy Dinesh
Baby Vichitra as Anu
Master N. Venkatraman
Ravishankar
Ravindranath
Kanniappan
P.T.C. Pandiyan
Sakthivel
Vellai Subbaiah
Varatharajan
Chinni Shanmugam

Soundtrack

The film score and the soundtrack were composed by Ilaiyaraaja, with lyrics written by Vaali and Siva.

References

External links

1991 films
Indian action thriller films
Films scored by Ilaiyaraaja
1990s Tamil-language films
Fictional portrayals of the Tamil Nadu Police
Tamil remakes of Marathi films
1991 action films
Films directed by Manobala